The 1972–73 Swedish Division I season was the 29th season of Swedish Division I. Leksands IF won the league title by finishing first in the final round.

First round

Northern Group

Southern Group

Qualification round

Northern Group

Southern Group

Final round

External links
 1972–73 season

Swedish
Swedish Division I seasons
1972–73 in Swedish ice hockey